"Give Me Back My Man" is a song written and recorded by the American rock band The B-52's. It was released as the second single from their 1980 album Wild Planet and is one of many solo vocal performances from  Cindy Wilson in the band's earlier years.

Live performances 

"Give Me Back My Man" was a staple in The B-52's' concerts in the 1980s and was usually one of the first few songs played. Early on, it was played mostly as it was on the record, with Schneider adding glockenspiel. After the release of the Party Mix! album in 1981, the band performed "Give Me Back My Man" and others in the extended style in which they were presented on that album. The song was re-integrated into the set of the B-52's' 2008 Funplex tour.

Track listing
Adapted from Discogs.
 "Give Me Back My Man" — 3:52
 "Give Me Back My Man" — 3:42 (instrumental)

Chart performance
The song charted on the U.S. Hot Dance Club Play chart along with album track "Party Out of Bounds" and prior single "Private Idaho", reaching number five (chart rules at the time allowed multiple album tracks to occupy the same position together). Released as a single in the UK, it hit number sixty-one on the UK Singles Chart.

Weird Al Yankovic version 
The main melody of "Give Me Back My Man" was incorporated into the Weird Al Yankovic song "Mr. Popeil" from the album "Weird Al" Yankovic in 3-D, along with female backing vocals that imitate some of the mannerisms of Kate Pierson and Cindy Wilson.

References

The B-52's songs
1980 singles
Songs written by Fred Schneider
Songs written by Kate Pierson
Songs written by Keith Strickland
Songs written by Cindy Wilson
Island Records singles
1980 songs